Camille 2000 is a 1969 film based on the 1848 novel and 1852 play La Dame aux Camélias by Alexandre Dumas, fils. It was adapted by Michael DeForrest and directed by Radley Metzger. It stars Danièle Gaubert and Nino Castelnuovo with Eleonora Rossi Drago and Massimo Serato.

Plot
Marguerite, a beautiful woman of affairs, falls for the young and promising Armand, but sacrifices her love for him for the sake of his future and reputation.

Cast

 Danièle Gaubert as Marguerite Gautier
 Nino Castelnuovo as Armand Duval
 Eleonora Rossi Drago as Prudence (credited as Eleonora Rossi-Drago)
 Roberto Bisacco as Gastion
 Massimo Serato as Armand's father
 Silvana Venturelli as Olympe
 Peter Chatel as Marguerite's Friend

Release
Camille 2000 opened in New York on July 16, 1969.

Reception
On Rotten Tomatoes, audiences relatively liked the film Camille 2000, at 68%, although critics panned the film with a 17% aggregated rating. Roger Ebert was not impressed and gave the film a one-star review.
Yet, some critics found strengths in Camille 2000. Film critic Gary Morris noted that the film is "a breathless series of ultra-plush environments that resonate with Italian haute design of the period" Critic Marcus Doidge referred to Camille 2000 as a "cult" favorite and noted the film "offered up way more drama than I expected from it. The story perfectly balances sex with drama and genuinely gives us a couple that are getting drawn closer and closer together, even when we know they would probably be better off apart at times".

Notes
According to one film reviewer, Radley Metzger's films, including those made during the Golden Age of Porn (1969–1984), are noted for their "lavish design, witty screenplays, and a penchant for the unusual camera angle". Another reviewer noted that his films were "highly artistic — and often cerebral ... and often featured gorgeous cinematography". Film and audio works by Metzger have been added to the permanent collection of the Museum of Modern Art (MoMA) in New York City.

See also
 Camille (disambiguation)

References

External links 
 Camille 2000 at  MUBI (related to The Criterion Collection)
 
 
 
 Camille 2000 (1969) at rogerebert.com

Films about prostitution in Italy
Films based on Camille
Films directed by Radley Metzger
Films scored by Piero Piccioni
English-language Italian films
1969 films
1969 drama films
Italian sexploitation films
1960s English-language films
1960s Italian films